Minister Alen VonShea Norman (November 2, 1971 – October 26, 2017), who went by the stage name Shea Norman, was an American gospel musician. He started his music career, in 2004, with the release of My Heart Depends on You, by Verity Records. This would be his breakthrough release upon the Billboard Gospel Albums chart. The song, "'Tis So Sweet", was placed on the WOW Gospel 2005.

Early life
Norman was born in Memphis, Tennessee as Alen VonShea Norman, on November 2, 1971, where he was raised by a minister father the Reverend James A. Norman. His first church, where he got the chance to minister was the Church of God in Christ in Millington under the tutelage of Reverend Carl Payne. Up until his death, Norman was a member of New Growth in Christ Christian Center located in Memphis, for the last thirteen years. He was urged by God to help the ministry, Ekklesia Christian Church, located in Sheffield, Alabama, where he has been since 2012. The church is led by Apostle Kobie S. & Pastor Katina Fitzgerald.

Music career
His music career commenced in 2004, with the album, My Heart Depends on You, that was released on September 14, 2004 by Verity Records. This album was his breakthrough release upon the Billboard magazine Gospel Albums chart at No. 17. While the song, "'Tis So Sweet", was placed on the compilation album WOW Gospel 2005.

Death
Norman died of complications from diabetes in Memphis on October 26, 2017 at the age of 45.

Discography

References

External links
 Cross Rhythms artist profile

1971 births
2017 deaths
African-American songwriters
African-American Christians
Musicians from Memphis, Tennessee
Songwriters from Tennessee
Songwriters from California
20th-century African-American people
21st-century African-American people